The State Register of Heritage Places is maintained by the Heritage Council of Western Australia. , 189 places are heritage-listed in the Shire of Capel, of which eleven are on the State Register of Heritage Places.

List
The Western Australian State Register of Heritage Places, lists the following eleven state registered places within the Shire of Capel:

References

Capel
 
Capel